The discography of the Japanese rock band Luna Sea, consists of 10 studio albums, 3 live albums, 10 compilations (including 3 box sets), 10 instrumental remix albums, 21 singles, and 32 home videos.

The band was founded in 1986 by bassist J and rhythm guitarist Inoran, when they were in high school. In 1989 they were joined by lead guitarist and violinist Sugizo, drummer Shinya and vocalist Ryuichi, a lineup that has remained the same. Originally called Lunacy, the band changed their name to Luna Sea upon their first album release in 1991. 

Due to their early use of make-up and costumes and their widespread popularity, Luna Sea are considered one of the most successful and influential bands in the visual kei movement. Throughout the mid '90s they used significantly less make-up, and after a one-year break in 1998, came back with a more mainstream alternative rock style and toned down their on-stage attire. When they disbanded in 2000, they left a big mark on the Japanese rock scene. In 2003, HMV Japan ranked Luna Sea at number 90 on their list of the 100 most important Japanese pop acts. Luna Sea have sold over 10 million certified records in Japan.

Luna Sea achieved their breakthrough success with a sold-out tour in 1991, which helped them get a contract with MCA Victor, and with the release of their second album Image (1992), which peaked at number 9 on the Oricon chart. Following critically acclaimed albums Eden in 1993 (No. 5), Mother in 1994 (No. 2) and Style in 1996 (No. 1), the band switched to Universal in 1998 and released their best-selling studio album, the number one Shine. In late 2000, after their seventh studio album Lunacy (No. 3), Luna Sea disbanded. In 2007 and 2008 they reunited for one-date shows, and in 2010 officially restarted activities. Their first new studio album in thirteen years, A Will (No.3), was released in 2013. Their ninth album, Luv (No. 4), followed four years later in 2017. At the end of 2019, Cross peaked at number 3 on the Oricon, but became their first to top Billboard Japan.

Albums

Studio albums

Self cover albums

Live albums

Compilation albums

Tribute album

Remix albums

Singles

Various artists compilations

Videos

Demos

Other
 Aionism – Aion (October 8, 1991)
Luna Sea members provide backing vocals on several songs.
 Unrivaled is Extasy ~ Extasy Summit '91 at Nippon Budokan (February 21, 1992)
Live recordings of a 1991 Extasy Summit, held by Extasy Records. Also features Tokyo Yankees, Virus, X Japan and several others.
 Minna ga Mumei-Datta, Dakedo... Muteki-Datta ~ Extasy Summit 1992, May 10, 1993, Extasy
Live recordings of the October 31, 1992 Extasy Summit, held by Extasy Records. Also features Deep, Media Youth, The Zolge, Tokyo Yankees, Screaming Mad George and Psychosis, Gilles de Rais, Zi:Kill and several others.
 "Rosier (Live Version)" (1994)
Won through a magazine contest.
 "Promise" (April 9, 2011)
A digital download song recorded and released specifically for the proceeds to be donated for recovery and relief from the 2011 Tōhoku earthquake and tsunami. Later included on the 2014 compilation album 25th Anniversary Ultimate Best -The One-.
 "Holy Knight" (December 23, 2016)
Limited Christmas song CD sold only at The Holy Night -Beyond the Limit- concerts at Saitama Super Arena on December 23 and 24, 2016.
 
Cover of the TM Network song for use as the third opening theme of the 2019 Mobile Suit Gundam: The Origin - Advent of the Red Comet anime. Released digitally on September 6, 2019, it peaked at number 79 on the Japan Hot 100, but reached number 15 on the Hot Animation chart, which tracks anime and video game music. The song was later included in the limited edition B version of their album Cross.
 "Make a Vow" (April 28, 2020)
A song created remotely within two weeks as an answer to the COVID-19 pandemic in Japan. Released digitally for free alongside a music video also created remotely, although fan club members received the song earlier.

References

Luna Sea
Discographies of Japanese artists
Rock music group discographies